The White House Office of Energy and Climate Change Policy was a government entity in the United States created in 2008 by President Barack Obama by Executive Order that existed for a little over two years when it was combined with another presidential office in April 2011. The office was created in order to coordinate administration policy on energy and global warming. Under the Biden administration, has been succeeded by both the Office of Domestic Climate Policy and the Office on Clean Energy Innovation and Implementation.

History
The office was created in December 2008. Its first (and only) director was Carol Browner, who was Administrator of the Environmental Protection Agency for the eight years of the Bill Clinton administration.

Barack Obama administration 
President Obama launched the Major Economies Forum on Energy and Climate Change, to facilitate candid dialogue among key developed and developing countries regarding efforts to advance clean energy and reduce greenhouse gas emissions. For the new forum, President Obama invited the leaders of 16 major economies and the Secretary General of the United Nations to designate representatives to participate in a preparatory session at the U.S. Department of State that occurred on April 27–28 in Washington, D.C. This and other preparatory sessions culminated in a 17-nation MEF meeting, as part of the 35th G8 summit which Italian Prime Minister Silvio Berlusconi agreed to host in La Maddalena, Italy in July 2009. The G8 summit was subsequently moved to L'Aquila, Italy, as part of an attempt to redistribute disaster funds after the 2009 L'Aquila earthquake. The forum took place on July 9, 2009.

Elimination
In April 2011, it was reported that Congress would no longer fund the office in the 2011 budget. On March 2, 2011 the White House announced that the climate and energy work done by the office would be transferred to the Domestic Policy Council, thereby eliminating it as an office within the White House Office. It was succeeded in 2021 by the White House Office of Domestic Climate Policy, headed by the White House National Climate Advisor.

See also 
 Americas Energy and Climate Symposium
 Climate change policy of the United States
 EERE
 Foreign policy of the Barack Obama administration
 IRENA
 Major Economies Forum on Energy and Climate Change
 Nationally Appropriate Mitigation Action
 U.S. Special Presidential Envoy for Climate
White House Climate Coordinator
White House Office on Clean Energy Innovation and Implementation

References

External links
 White House Executive Office of the President — list of offices

Defunct agencies of the Executive Office of the President of the United States
Presidency of Barack Obama
Energy policy of the United States
Climate change policy in the United States
Energy and Climate Change Policy